Greengate is an inner-city suburb of Salford in Greater Manchester, England. It is bounded by the River Irwell, Victoria Bridge Street and Chapel Street, Blackfriars Road and Trinity Way.  Greengate is the original historic core of Salford and sits within the easternmost part of the City of Salford. Greengate is currently experiencing a period of intensive development activity and growth, benefiting from its location just across the River Irwell from the City of Manchester.

History

Greengate was the oldest part and the heart of the medieval town of Salford. It was where the Hundred of Salford was based, making it the administrative centre for judicial and military purposes for an area roughly equivalent to present day Greater Manchester.  It was the location of the town market and annual fairs which were held at the Salford Cross on Greengate itself.  The site of the market place in Greengate still survives where Greengate meets Gravel Lane. This area also contained a court house, stocks and conduit (pump). Salford Bridge was built over the Irwell in the 14th century, connecting Salford to Manchester. The bridge was the scene of a battle in 1642 in which Royalist supporting forces from Salford were repulsed by Parliamentarian forces who held Manchester. Greengate was noted for textiles and dyeing long before the Industrial Revolution, but from the early 19th century it developed a reputation for poverty and slum housing alongside sections of manufacturing. By the mid-19th century, almost two thirds of the population of Salford were crowded into the small area of Greengate. The area housed Salford's workhouse from 1793 until 1853.

In 1800 the clergyman William Cowherd established a new congregation in Greengate on King Street, building the chapel (Christ Church) at his own expense. The chapel saw the development of a denomination (the Bible Christian Church) which became influential in the modern establishment of the vegetarianism movement - Cowherd promulgated the doctrine that people should "eat no more meat till the world endeth" and abstain from alcoholic drinks. The message was preached in the U.S. when 41 members of the congregation in Greengate crossed the Atlantic in 1817. Cowherd was buried in the churchyard.

Collier Street Public Baths (named after the Methodist Minister, Samuel Francis Collier) were opened by Manchester and Salford Baths and Laundry Company Inc in 1855. It was usual for public baths to offer facilities for both bathing and the washing and drying of clothes and bedding, since many workers cottages had either grossly inadequate facilities or none at all. This remained common practice until after World War I. The Baths closed in 1880 when Salford Corporation opened their own baths on nearby Blackfriars Street. The men's pool was larger and more ornate than the ladies' pool. An unusual feature of the Baths were the laminated wooden roof arches. The Baths closed in the early 20th century and later became a matchbox factory. During World War II an air raid shelter was built in the deep end of the ladies' pool.

The Roman Catholic church of St Peter was built in 1863 to the design of E. W. Pugin. It is in a modest Gothic revival style and has an eastern apse.

In 1926, the second birth control clinic outside London opened to women seeking free family planning advice here. The clinic provided birth control information to working class women who were unable to pay for private advice. The controversial clinic faced opposition from the Catholic Church and the medical profession but continued to offer its services to women until birth control advice was widely and freely available in the 1970s.

In the 21st century, the area has undergone a process of regeneration. The redevelopment of the former Victoria Bus Station, just across the Irwell from Manchester Cathedral, includes Greengate Square which has an amphitheatre for events, concerts and markets, as well as office, hotel and retail space

References

Areas of Salford